Nepal–Spain relations are the bilateral relations between Nepal and Spain. Nepal has an embassy in Madrid. Spain is accredited to Nepal from its embassy in New Delhi, India.

Diplomatic relations 
Nepal maintains full diplomatic relations with Spain since May 14, 1968, however the lack of high-level contacts and visits in recent years, as well as the practical absence of economic and commercial relations means that bilateral relations do not have a broad content.

On September 19, 1983, the Kings of Nepal made a state visit to Madrid, accompanied by the Minister of Foreign Affairs, Padma Bahadur Khatri. Bahadur met with his Spanish counterpart, Fernando Morán López. The Kings of Spain, accompanied by Infanta Cristina of Spain, and the Minister of Foreign Affairs, Francisco Fernández Ordóñez, traveled to Nepal from November 22 to 25, 1987.

The Minister of Tourism, Culture and Civil Aviation of Nepal, Prithvi Suba Gurung, visited Spain in mid-November 2007 with the aim of promoting business relations and contacting Spanish investors, mainly from the tourism sector. Pampha Bhusal, Nepalese Minister of Social Affairs, traveled to Madrid in early 2008 where he became interested in the operation of the juvenile centers of the regional government and showed interest in the 74 Nepalese minors adopted since 2003 Madrid families.

In accordance with the initiative to deepen relations with Nepal, the Action Plan towards Asia and the Pacific in its third period 2008-2012 seeks to intensify political contacts with the new Government and authorities in Nepal. In addition, the feasibility of AECID financing a cooperation project in support of children and / or promotion of women, which would be presented by the United Nations Population Fund, with an office in Kathmandu, with the support of the Ministry of Women, Children and Social Welfare of Nepal; In this sense, the United Nations has been asked to present a project. In addition, given the importance of adoptions by Spaniards in Nepal in recent years, and the collaboration shown by the Nepalese authorities, it seems appropriate to carry out a cooperation project on the matter, especially taking into account that Nepal needs foreign cooperation to address the situation of existing generalized poverty.

Regarding the work of public diplomacy, the sending of a Casa Asia Friendship mission is included in the program, consisting of the visit of a delegation with the objective of establishing contacts and taking steps to achieve a greater bond with civil societies from that country.

Cooperation 
Spain has not initiated, for the moment, projects at the central government level in the field of development cooperation in Nepal. There is no TBT in the Indian territory that manages cooperation, nor regional cooperation agencies at the level of Autonomous Communities. Spanish cooperation in the country is managed multilaterally through different international organizations involved in existing cooperation projects in Nepal, most of which are inserted into the UN system. There are also 9 Spanish NGOs acting in Nepalese territory.

See also
 Foreign relations of Nepal
 Foreign relations of Spain

References 

 
Spain
Nepal